The 2020–21 Carolina Hurricanes season was the 42nd season for the National Hockey League (NHL) franchise that was established in June 1979, and 23rd season since the franchise relocated from the Hartford Whalers to start the 1997–98 NHL season.

On December 20, 2020, the league temporarily realigned into four divisions with no conferences due to the COVID-19 pandemic and the ongoing closure of the Canada–United States border. As a result of this realignment, the Hurricanes played this season in the Central Division and only played games against the other teams in their new division during the regular season and potentially the first two rounds of the playoffs.

On April 26, the Hurricanes clinched a playoff berth after a 4–3 overtime loss to the Dallas Stars. They went on to clinch their first division title since 2006. They defeated the Nashville Predators in the First Round in six games, but were defeated by the Tampa Bay Lightning in the Second Round in five games.

Standings

Schedule and results

Regular season
The regular season schedule was published on December 23, 2020.

Playoffs

Notes

References

Carolina Hurricanes
Carolina Hurricanes seasons
Carolina Hurricanes
Carolina Hurricanes